Jules Frédéric Charles Andrade (4 September 1857, Paris – 25 February 1933, Brighton near Cayeux-sur-Mer) was a French physicist, mathematician and horologist. He won the Poncelet Prize for 1917.

Career
After graduation from l’École polytechnique and military service in the artillery, he became a professor at the University of Rennes and later at the University of Montpellier. On 3 June 1899 he was an expert witness for Alfred Dreyfus in the famous trial during the Dreyfus Affair. He was a professor for 26 years at the Institut de Chronométrie at the University of Besançon. Andrade did research related to mechanical clocks.

Andrade was an Invited Speaker of the ICM in 1897 at Zürich, in 1904 at Heidelberg, in 1908 at Rome, and in 1924 at Toronto.

Works
 Chronométrie (1908)
 Le mouvement, les mesures du temps et de l'étendue (1911)
 Les organes réglants des chronomètres (1920)
 Horlogerie et chronométrie (1924)
 Mécanique Physique, Nabu Press, Reprint 2010, 
 Leçons de Mécanique Physique, Nabu Press, Reprint 2010, 
 La géometrie naturelle en deux livres

References

French clockmakers
20th-century French mathematicians
20th-century French physicists
Academic staff of the University of Rennes
1857 births
1933 deaths